The Eylau was an 80-gun Bucentaure-class 80-gun ship of the line of the French Navy, designed by Sané.

Begun as Saturne, she was renamed Eylau while still under construction. She was commissioned on 11 March 1809 under Captain Jurien de La Gravière.

In 1811, she was the flagship of Admiral Allemand. The next year she was transferred to Toulon.

After the Bourbon Restoration, she took station in the Caribbean under Captain Larue.

She was eventually broken up in Brest in 1829.

References
 Jean-Michel Roche, Dictionnaire des Bâtiments de la flotte de guerre française de Colbert à nos jours, tome I

Ships of the line of the French Navy
Ships built in France
Bucentaure-class ships of the line
1808 ships